Cochylichroa is a genus of tortricid moths in the family Tortricidae. They are found primarily in North America, although Cochylichroa atricapitana is a Palearctic species.

The genus Cochylichroa was redefined in 2019 to contain nine species related in phylogenetic analysis; most were previously placed in the genus Conchylis.

Species
These nine species belong to the genus Cochylichroa:
 Cochylichroa arthuri (Dang, 1984) – Arthur's sunflower moth
 Cochylichroa atricapitana
 Cochylichroa aurorana (Kearfott, 1907)
 Cochylichroa avita (Razowski, 1997),
 Cochylichroa foxcana (Kearfott, 1907),
 Cochylichroa hoffmanana (Kearfott, 1907) – Hoffman's cochlid
 Cochylichroa hospes (Walsingham, 1884) – banded sunflower moth
 Cochylichroa temerana (Busck, 1907)
 Cochylichroa viscana (Kearfott, 1907)

References

Tortricinae
Tortricidae genera